Mali competed at the 2016 Summer Olympics in Rio de Janeiro, Brazil, from 5 to 21 August 2016. Since the nation made its debut in 1964, Malian athletes had appeared in every edition of the Summer Olympic Games, with the exception of the 1976 Summer Olympics in Montreal because of the African boycott.

Mali National Olympic and Sports Committee selected a team of six athletes, four men and two women, to compete only in athletics, judo, swimming, and taekwondo at the Games, matching the nation's roster size with London 2012. Among the Malian athletes were freestyle swimmer Fatoumata Samassékou, the lone returning Olympian from the previous Games, and taekwondo fighter and 2015 world bronze medalist Ismaël Coulibaly, who led the squad as the most successful member and the nation's flag bearer in the opening ceremony. Mali, however, has yet to win its first ever Olympic medal.

Athletics (track and field)
 
Mali has received universality slots from IAAF to send two athletes (one male and one female) to the Olympics.

Track & road events

Field events

Judo

Mali has qualified one judoka for the men's half-heavyweight category (100 kg) at the Games. Ayouba Traore earned a continental quota spot from the African region, as the highest-ranked Malian judoka outside of direct qualifying position in the IJF World Ranking List of May 30, 2016.

Swimming

Mali has received a Universality invitation from FINA to send two swimmers (one male and one female) to the Olympics.

Taekwondo
 
Mali entered one athlete into the taekwondo competition at the Olympics. 2015 Worlds bronze medalist Ismaël Coulibaly secured a spot in the men's welterweight category (80 kg) by virtue of his top two finish at the 2016 African Qualification Tournament in Agadir, Morocco.

References

External links
 
 

Nations at the 2016 Summer Olympics
2016
Olympics